Naira Hovakimyan (born September 21, 1966) is an Armenian control theorist who holds the W. Grafton and Lillian B. Wilkins professorship of the Mechanical Science and Engineering at the University of Illinois at Urbana-Champaign. She is the director of AVIATE Center of flying cars at UIUC, funded through a NASA University Leadership Initiative. She was the inaugural director of the Intelligent Robotics Laboratory during 2015-2017, associated with the Coordinated Science Laboratory at the University of Illinois at Urbana-Champaign.

Education 
Naira Hovakimyan received her MS degree in Theoretical Mechanics and Applied Mathematics in 1988 from Yerevan State University in Armenia. She got her Ph.D. in Physics and Mathematics in 1992, in Moscow, from the Institute of Applied Mathematics of Russian Academy of Sciences, majoring in optimal control and differential games.

Academic life 
Before joining the faculty of the University of Illinois at Urbana–Champaign in 2008, Naira Hovakimyan has spent time as a research scientist at Stuttgart University in Germany, at INRIA in France, at Georgia Institute of Technology, and she was on faculty of Aerospace and Ocean engineering of Virginia Tech during 2003-2008. She is currently W. Grafton and Lillian B. Wilkins Professor of Mechanical Science and Engineering at UIUC. In 2015, she was named as inaugural director for Intelligent Robotics Laboratory of CSL at UIUC. Currently she is the director of AVIATE Center of flying cars at UIUC, funded through a NASA University Leadership Initiative. She has co-authored two books, ten book chapters, eleven patents, and more than 450 journal and conference papers.

Research areas 

Her research interests are in control and optimization, autonomous systems, machine learning, cybersecurity, neural networks, game theory and their applications in aerospace, robotics, mechanical, agricultural, electrical, petroleum, biomedical engineering and elderly care.

Honors 
She is the 2011 recipient of AIAA Mechanics and Control of Flight award, the 2015 recipient of SWE Achievement Award, the 2017 recipient of IEEE CSS Award for Technical Excellence in Aerospace Controls, and the 2019 recipient of AIAA Pendray Aerospace Literature Award. In 2014 she was awarded the Humboldt prize for her lifetime achievements and was recognized as Hans Fischer senior fellow of Technical University of Munich.  She is Fellow and life member of AIAA, Fellow of IEEE, Senior Member of National Academy of Inventors, and a member of SIAM, AMS, SWE, ASME and ISDG. Naira is co-founder and Chief Scientist of IntelinAir.

She is named 2017 Commencement Speaker of the American University of Armenia. She has been listed among 50 Global Armenians in the world by Mediamax and was a member of the FAST (The Foundation for Armenian Science and Technology) advisory board. She is also advising a few startup companies.

In 2021 she was one of the speakers of TEDxYerevan event. In 2022, she was awarded a Fulbright fellowship from the US Department of State. In 2022, she founded the AVIATE Center  of flying cars at UIUC.

References

External links 
http://naira-hovakimyan.mechse.illinois.edu/
https://aviate.illinois.edu/
Google Scholar
Research group website
https://csl.illinois.edu/directory/profile/nhovakim
http://mechse.illinois.edu/directory/faculty/nhovakim

University of Illinois faculty
1966 births
Living people
Game theorists
Control theorists
Fellows of the American Institute of Aeronautics and Astronautics
Fellow Members of the IEEE